is a Japanese television series, spin-off from the Garo metaseries. The series focuses on Jinga, now a reincarnated Makai Knight while facing his past darkness he assumed during the events of Garo: Gold Storm Sho and the film Garo: Kami no Kiba. Masahiro Inoue reprised his role on the lead character.

Plot

After the former Makai Knight turned Horror Jinga was defeated by Ryuga Dougai as Garo during the events of Garo: Kami no Kiba, he returned to the Makai Realm and challenged Messiah. He lost that battle and his soul drifted through the darkness for a time; he somehow found himself reborn into the light again. Unaware of his dark past life, he's reborn into the Mikage family and became a Makai Knight once again. His new life hasn't been easy as his father, Mizuto Mikage, turned to the dark side and became a Horror, killing his wife before being slayed by him. While still recovering from the incident, Jinga becomes partners with Makai Priest Fusa while managing the training of his little brother Toma, later gaining by accident a power that allows him to purify Horrors without killing their hosts, something never seen before in the long history of the Makai Knights, which draws the attention of the Watchdogs. But no one suspects the true nature of Jinga's abilities as his past-life is beginning to re-surface from within him.

Episodes
<onlyinclude>{|class="wikitable"
|-style="border-bottom:8px solid #AE0E4B"
! style="width:1%;"  | No.
! English title Original Japanese title
! style="width:14%;" | Writer
! style="width:14%;" | Original airdate
|-

|}

Cast
, : 
: 
: 
, : 
: 
: 
: 
: 
: 
: 
: 
:

Theme songs
Opening theme

Lyrics: Masami Okui
Composition: Hironobu Kageyama
Arrangement: Hisashi Koyama
Artist: JAM Project
Ending theme

Composition: Hironobu Kageyama
Arrangement: Shiho Terada, Yoshichika Kuriyama

References

External links
 Official website 
 Official website at Tokyo MX 

Garo (TV series)
Tokusatsu television series
Japanese horror fiction television series
Martial arts television series
Tokyo MX original programming
2018 Japanese television series debuts